Amnèsia is an Italian comedy-drama film directed by Gabriele Salvatores and released in March 8 2002.

Plot
Several stories unfold simultaneously over three days on the Mediterranean island of Ibiza. A man stumbles upon a risky opportunity to become instantly wealthy; a producer of pornographic films tries to rebuild his relationship with his estranged daughter; a police chief and his son maintain an uneasy co-existence; and a woman longs for her lover to be released from prison.

Cast 
 Diego Abatantuono - Sandro
 Sergio Rubini - Angelino
 Martina Stella - Luce
  - Ernesto
 Juanjo Puigcorbé - Xavier
 Rubén Ochandiano - Jorge
 María Jurado - Alicia
 Antonia San Juan - Pilar
 Ian McNeice - Doug Chandler
 Alessandra Martines - Virginie
 Ugo Conti - Dani

References

External links

2002 films
2002 comedy-drama films
2000s Italian-language films
Films directed by Gabriele Salvatores
Films about pornography
Italian comedy-drama films
Films set in Ibiza
2000s Italian films